Borja Angoitia Etxeberría (born 23 April 1992) is a Spanish footballer who plays as a goalkeeper.

Career
Angoitia played four years of college soccer at Quinnipiac University between 2011 and 2014, where he made a total of 68 appearances. While at Quinnipiac, he also appeared for USL PDL side Ocean City Nor'easters in 2014.

Out of college, Angoitia signed with clubs in Spain and the United States, appearing for SD Deusto, FC Tucson and Amorebieta before joining United Soccer League side Rio Grande Valley FC Toros in March 2017. In 2018, he joined Canadian side Toronto FC II.

References

External links

Bobcats bio

1992 births
Living people
Spanish footballers
Footballers from Bilbao
Association football goalkeepers
Segunda División B players
Tercera División players
SD Amorebieta footballers
USL League Two players
USL Championship players
Quinnipiac Bobcats men's soccer players
Ocean City Nor'easters players
FC Tucson players
Rio Grande Valley FC Toros players
Toronto FC II players
Spanish expatriate footballers
Spanish expatriate sportspeople in the United States
Expatriate soccer players in the United States
SD Deusto players